The SweetWater 420 Fest is an annual event presented by SweetWater Brewing Company in Atlanta, Georgia held on a weekend closest to Earth Day.  In 2014, the festival announced it would be celebrating its 10th anniversary at its new home in Centennial Olympic Park.

Origin 
The first festival began in Oakhurst, Georgia, with 3,000 attendees, as a way for the brewery to bring together all of the elements it was passionate about in one place – music, beer and the environment. Patrons drank SweetWater beer while watching headlining musical act Tea Leaf Green. Two years later, the festival would call Little Five Points' Candler Park home, where it remained until 2013.  As of its 10th Anniversary in 2014, SweetWater 420 Festival now welcomes fans to their new home at Centennial Olympic Park in the heart of Atlanta. Environmental awareness continues to have a large presence at the festival, which also features musicians and local artists and vendors.

Activities 
As an Earth Day celebration, the SweetWater 420 Festival hosts charities, non-profits and environmental workshops in its Planet 420 Non-Profit Village alongside the live music stages, food trucks, artist market, and beer stations.
The festival also hosts an annual SweetWater 420 Fest 5K, in which participants run through the park and surrounding neighborhood in a USATF qualifying course on the Saturday morning of the weekend festival.

Musical acts 
From local favorites to national artists, the festival features headlining musical acts each day of the weekend-long event. The number of attendees has grown since the festival's inception, and it has attracted many popular musicians.

 2019 festival
 Performers: Widespread Panic, Joe Russo's Almost Dead, The Avett Brothers, JJ Grey & Mofro, Jason Isbell, Keller Williams

 2018 festival
 Performers: Joe Russo's Almost Dead, Anders Osborne, Tedeschi Trucks Band, Vulfpeck, The Record Company, The String Cheese Incident, The Motet, Umphrey's McGee

 2017 festival
 Performers: Widespread Panic, Trey Anastasio Band, moe., Anders Osborne, Twiddle, Slightly Stoopid, the Dirty Heads

 2016 festival
 Performers: Kid Rock, Ben Harper and the Innocent Criminals, Bastille, Ludacris, Disco Biscuits, Cypress Hill, The Roots, North Mississippi Allstars, Maceo Parker

 2015 festival
 Performers: Snoop Dogg, 311, Primus, AER, Gov't Mule, Big Data, Cage The Elephant, moe.

 2014 festival
 Performers: Steel Pulse, Sublime with Rome, Chris Robinson Brotherhood, Galactic, EOTO, G. Love and Special Sauce, Wesley Cook, Dirty Dozen Brass Band

 2013 festival 
 Performers: George Clinton & Parliament Funkadelic, Robert Randolph & The Family Band, Ivan Neville’s Dumpstaphunk, Black Joe Lewis & the Honeybears

 2012 festival
 Performers: Maceo Parker, Perpetual Groove, Donna the Buffalo, The Mickey Hart Band feat. Dave Schools, Soulive, Anders Osborne

 2011 festival 
 30,000 guests 
 Performers: Galactic, Railroad Earth, Arrested Development, 7 Walkers

References 

Music festivals in Atlanta
Concerts in the United States